UFC: Tapout, also known as Ultimate Fighting Championship: Tapout, is a video game in the fighting genre based upon the Ultimate Fighting Championship. The game was released in 2002 for the Xbox console.

Tapout was published by Crave Entertainment and developed by DreamFactory. The subtitle Tapout refers to a fighter tapping his hand indicating that he has submitted to a submission hold. A tapout, along with a knockout, judge's decision, and referee stoppage, is one of the ways of ending a UFC bout.

The game features many of UFC's top stars including Matt Hughes, Chuck Liddell, Mark Coleman, Frank Shamrock, and Tito Ortiz. Competitions can take place in several modes such as exhibition, tournament, arcade, and championship mode. Several fighters throughout the game are unlockable such as two female competitors and celebrity Ice-T.

A sequel to this game entitled UFC: Tapout 2 was released in 2003. Other than an updated roster, the game is very similar to the first Tapout and received similar reviews. Tapout 2 was published by TDK Mediactive. Both games have an ESRB rating of T for Teen.

Reception

UFC: Tapout received "average" reviews according to the review aggregation website Metacritic. In Japan, where the game was ported for release under the name  and published by Capcom on April 18, 2002, Famitsu gave it a score of 30 out of 40.

GameSpot named it the third-best video game of February 2002.

See also

List of fighting games

References

External links
 

2002 video games
Capcom games
Crave Entertainment games
Ubisoft games
Ultimate Fighting Championship video games
Video games developed in Japan
Xbox games
Xbox-only games
Multiplayer and single-player video games
DreamFactory games
TDK Mediactive games